Union Bible College and Academy is a private Quaker educational institution combining a high school, college, and seminary in Westfield, Indiana. It was founded in 1911 by the Central Yearly Meeting of Friends and is a part of the wider conservative holiness movement. It was listed on the National Register of Historic Places in 1995.

History 
In 1860, members of the Religious Society of Friends, concerned about the spiritual and academic upbringing of their children in light of the American Civil War, constructed a two-story brick building that came to be known as Union High School. It went into operation on January 7, 1861.

At the turn of the twentieth century, amid waning enrollment due to the advent of public schools in the area, a minister named William M. Smith was approached by the school committee to expand the operations of the campus. They wanted to incorporate training programs for aspiring ministers and missionaries. Smith accepted the offer and founded Union Bible Seminary in May 1911.

In 1980, both the seminary and academy assumed an interdenominational status. In June 1989, the seminary was renamed as Union Bible College.

Accreditation 
Union Bible College is accredited by the Association for Biblical Higher Education.

Campus 

Union High Academy Historic District is a historic Quaker academic institution including a high school, college and seminary, as well as a national historic district located at Westfield, Hamilton County, Indiana. It encompasses five contributing buildings built between 1861 and 1929. They are the Greek Revival / Italianate style main classroom building (1861, 1883, 1946, 1953); Greek Revival style President's House (Estes House, 1861), a frame dormitory (1929), and two brick dormitories (c. 1861) that are now private homes.

Newspaper 
The student newspaper published by Union Bible College and Seminary is The Union Minister.

References

External links
Official website

Quaker universities and colleges
Holiness universities and colleges
Seminaries and theological colleges in Indiana
Bible colleges
Historic districts on the National Register of Historic Places in Indiana
School buildings on the National Register of Historic Places in Indiana
Greek Revival architecture in Indiana
Italianate architecture in Indiana
Schools in Hamilton County, Indiana
Historic districts in Hamilton County, Indiana
National Register of Historic Places in Hamilton County, Indiana
1911 establishments in Indiana